Forest Lake Township is a township in Susquehanna County, Pennsylvania, United States. The population was 1,121 as of the 2020 census.

History
Forest Lake Township was formed from parts of Bridgewater, Silver Lake, and Middletown Townships on May 4, 1836.

In the 1900s, there was an art camp for girls on the lake itself called Camp Sylvania.

Geography

Demographics

As of the census of 2010, there were 1,193 people, 474 households, and 355 families residing in the township.  The population density was 40 people per square mile (15.4/km2).  There were 634 housing units at an average density of 21.3/sq mi (8.3/km2).  The racial makeup of the township was 98.7% White, 0.3% Asian, 0.2% from other races, and 0.8% from two or more races. Hispanic or Latino of any race were 0.8% of the population.

There were 474 households, out of which 29.5% had children under the age of 18 living with them, 62.7% were married couples living together, 6.3% had a female householder with no husband present, and 25.1% were non-families. 19.2% of all households were made up of individuals, and 8.7% had someone living alone who was 65 years of age or older.  The average household size was 2.52 and the average family size was 2.88.

In the township the population was spread out, with 21.1% under the age of 18, 62.3% from 18 to 64, and 16.6% who were 65 years of age or older.  The median age was 45 years.

The median income for a household in the township was $47,500, and the median income for a family was $53,846. Males had a median income of $43,167 versus $25,515 for females. The per capita income for the township was $22,251.  About 5.4% of families and 6.9% of the population were below the poverty line, including 14.6% of those under age 18 and 4.7% of those age 65 or over.

References

Townships in Susquehanna County, Pennsylvania
Populated places established in 1799
Townships in Pennsylvania